Osteochilus spilurus is a cyprinid freshwater fish from Southeast Asia.
It is found in Thailand, Peninsular Malaysia, Sumatra, Java, and Borneo.
It grows to  SL.

Habitat 
Osteochilus spilurus is common and abundant in creeks and small water bodies in forests. It also occurs in peatswamp forest.

References

Osteochilus
Freshwater fish of Borneo
Fauna of Brunei
Freshwater fish of Indonesia
Freshwater fish of Malaysia
Fish of Thailand
Taxa named by Pieter Bleeker
Fish described in 1851